Lillian Adelman  (1899 – 1985) was an American artist known for her work with the Federal Art Project of the Works Progress Administration (WPA). Her work is included in the collections of the Metropolitan Museum of Art, the Museum of Modern Art,  the National Gallery of Art, the Philadelphia Museum of Art, and the Yale University Art Gallery.

Gallery

References

External links

1899 births
1985 deaths
20th-century American printmakers
20th-century American women artists
American women printmakers
Federal Art Project artists